Space travel can refer to:
Spaceflight, flying into or through outer space
Spacefaring, to be capable of and active in space travel
Human spaceflight, space travel with a crew or passengers
Interplanetary spaceflight, travel between planets
Interstellar travel, travel between stars or planetary systems
Intergalactic travel, hypothetical travel between galaxies
Space Travel (video game), developed by Ken Thompson in 1969
Space travel in science fiction